New York's 148th State Assembly district is one of the 150 districts in the New York State Assembly. It has been represented by Joseph Giglio since 2013.

Geography
District 148 contains all of Allegany and Cattaraugus counties and portions of Steuben County.

Recent election results

2022

2020

2018

2016

2014

2012

References

148
Cattaraugus County, New York
Allegany County, New York
Steuben County, New York